Naina is a 2002 Tamil language comedy horror film directed by Manobala. The film stars Jayaram in a dual role and Manya, with Vadivelu, Ramesh Khanna, Bhanupriya Kovai Sarala, and Rajan P. Dev playing supporting roles. The film, produced by V. Santhakumar, had musical score by Sabesh–Murali and was released on 30 August 2002.

Plot
The film begins with Annamalai (Jayaram), a ghost, trying to talk to his son Pasupathy (Jayaram), but nobody has been able to see or hear him since his death. Pasupathy is a taxi driver, and he is in love with the lawyer Vaanathi (Manya). Aavudaiyappan (Vadivelu), a con medium, becomes the only one who can hear Annamalai. After being annoyed by Annamalai, Aavudaiyappan finally decides to help him. They meet Pasupathy, but Pasupathy seems to hate his deceased father.

In the past, the widower Annamalai was a wealthy man and womanizer. Every time there was a good news in his village, he tonsured Pasupathy's head. He later got married a second time with Azhagu Nachiyar (Bhanupriya), and they had a daughter. During a ceremony, a person pushed from behind in Yajna. The villagers thought that the innocent Pasupathy killed his father, so he ran away.

Annamalai does not know the person who killed him. Pasupathy decides to go back to his village. He wants to prove his innocence at all costs and wants to find the one who killed his father. When Azhagu Nachiyar meets Velu (Rajan P. Dev), who is Annamalai's brother, she becomes unconscious. Annamalai regains her consciousness and makes her overhear Velu's conversation. It turns out that Velu had killed Annamalai to grab his property and blamed the murder on Pasupathy. In the climax, Pasupathy will performs the last rites of his father, while Velu tries to disrupt the rites. Velu gets burned and also becomes a ghost. In the end, Pasupathy joins his father's position in the village.

Cast

Jayaram as Annamalai and Pasupathy
Manya as Vaanathi
Vadivelu as Aavudaiyappan
Ramesh Khanna as Pichu
Bhanupriya as Azhagu Nachiyar
Kovai Sarala as Angayarkanni
Rajan P. Dev as Velu
Delhi Ganesh as Sambu
Vennira Aadai Moorthy as Mathrubootham
Charle as Pazhani
Vaiyapuri
Thalaivasal Vijay
Pandu as Pandu and Pundu
Thyagu as 'Vedigundu' Muthu
Madhan Bob as Annamalai
Chelladurai as Chelladurai
Bonda Mani as Mani
Jayamani
Master Bharath as young Pasupathy
Manobala as voice from heaven
Aruldoss as man who scolds Aavudaiyappan (uncredited)

Soundtrack

The film score and soundtrack were composed by Sabesh–Murali. The soundtrack, released in 2002, features 6 tracks with lyrics written by P. Vijay, Viveka, and K. Subash.

Reception
Sify wrote "Naina starring Jayaram in a dual role and supposed to be a comedy is a torture inflicted on the helpless audience by director Manobala." Chennai Online wrote "The film probably would have turned out better, if the director was clear as to whether he wanted the film to be a comic caper or a sentimental, suspense thriller. An injudicious blending of both, has resulted in a film that fails to satisfy".

References

External links 
 

2002 films
2000s Tamil-language films
Indian comedy horror films
Indian films about revenge
Films directed by Manobala